Louis Bennett LeCocq (March 27, 1892 – May 31, 1919) was an American racecar driver.  LeCocq and his riding mechanic Robert Bandini were killed in the 1919 Indianapolis 500 after the fuel tank on their "Roamer" ruptured and exploded.

Indianapolis 500 results

See also 
List of fatalities at the Indianapolis Motor Speedway

References

External links 

1892 births
1919 deaths
People from Pella, Iowa
Racing drivers from Iowa
Indianapolis 500 drivers
AAA Championship Car drivers
American racing drivers
Racing drivers who died while racing
Sports deaths in Indiana